Storm of the Light's Bane is the second full-length album by Swedish black metal band Dissection. It was released on 17 November 1995 by Nuclear Blast. This would be the band's last full-length album before Nödtveidt's 1997 incarceration for the felony murder of Josef ben Meddour. It would not be until 2006 that they would release their third and final album Reinkaos, which was followed by the breakup of the band and Jon Nödtveidt's suicide shortly after. As with the band's debut album, Kristian 'Necrolord' Wåhlin created the artwork.

The album is widely considered a masterpiece and one of the best black metal albums ever written. It has had significant influence on the development of extreme metal, inspiring many bands such as Watain, whose frontman played bass live with the band during their final shows.

Musical style, writing, and composition 
The album is notable for being one of the earliest and most successful examples of a band combining black metal with the melodic death metal sound that was developing in Gothenburg around the time of this album's release. According to Metal Hammer, "While Sweden's Dissection were very much black metal in terms of ideology and atmosphere, they also featured noticeable elements of the melodic death metal movement exploding in their home country, as well as classic '80s heavy metal." Dave Schalek wrote that "the songs are cold, dark, evil and extreme." OC Weekly have described the album as "extreme and aggressive but also primeval and classically orchestrated with heavy echoes of drums and haunting melodies hidden throughout the darkness."

In an interview, Jon Nödtveidt said that though "everything we do is connected through death in one way or another. This is not an album where all the songs follow a story. On this record, all the songs and music are different but still have that death theme within them to tie them in some form or another." He also added that "We never limit ourselves even if we feel we play dark, death metal. We don't write our music to fit into a certain pattern."

Release history
In 1995, Nuclear Blast released a Europe-exclusive special digipak version of the album limited to 500 copies, which upon unfolding formed the shape of a cross with the song's lyrics printed on the sleeves. It was re-released in 2002 as a digipak (catalogue number: NB 646-2), this time with the 1997 EP Where Dead Angels Lie as bonus tracks. The Japanese edition features the bonus track "Feathers Fell" as track 5, in between "Where Dead Angels Lie" and "Retribution – Storm of the Light's Bane". The album was re-released once again in 2006 by The End Records in a two-disc set, and includes the Where Dead Angels Lie EP, an unreleased EP from 1994 featuring two songs from the album, and an "alternate mix" version of the full album, all remastered from the original master tapes by Håkan Åkesson at Cutting Room Studios in Stockholm, and packaged in a slipcase. This version is touted as the "Ultimate Reissue".

Reception and legacy

Critical reception

The album is routinely cited as a landmark album in the history of black metal, and as one of the earliest examples of a band blending black metal and death metal, more particularly, melodic death metal. 

In his review of the album for AllMusic, William York described all of the album's songs as "expertly crafted mini-epics" with thematic unity and memorable melodies, adding that the album is "deservedly hailed as a landmark" of the genre.

Sputnikmusic mentions the attention to detail in the music and the "meticulous structure" of each song, naming the album the legacy of the band.

Metal Hammer named it one of the 20 best black metal albums of the 90s, noting the influence of melodic death metal, and describing it as "a melodic, majestic and gloriously epic listen that features a measured, bombastic tone yet also makes use of furious, high-paced delivery when necessary." 

Loudwire describe it as a "milestone in extreme metal" and "one to chill the bones and the only one of its kind."

Accolades

Track listing
Track listing adapted from liner notes.

Personnel
 Dissection
 Jon Nödtveidt – vocals, lead, rhythm & acoustic guitars
 Johan Norman – rhythm guitar
 Peter Palmdahl – bass guitar
 Ole Öhman – drums

 Additional musicians
 Alexandra Balogh – piano
 Legion – backing vocals on "Thorns of Crimson Death"
 Tony Särkkä – backing vocals on "Soulreaper"

 Production
 Arranged & produced by Dissection
 Recorded, engineered & mixed by Dan Swanö
 Håkan Åkesson – mastering & remastering (2006)
 Necrolord – cover artwork
 Oscar Matsson – photography

References

Further reading
 "Black Metal Foundations Top 20: The First Wave" (2005). Terrorizer #128: 42–43.

Dissection (band) albums
1995 albums
Nuclear Blast albums
Albums with cover art by Kristian Wåhlin